Knapp Creek may refer to:

Knapp Creek (Iowa)
Knapp Creek (West Virginia)